The  was an intermodal passenger transport service linking Victoria station in London with Gare du Nord in Paris, via  Gatwick Airport  and  Le Touquet Airport, northern France.  In operation between 1956 and the opening of the Channel Tunnel, it used a combination of rail and air transport, and, for some of its existence, also buses.

See also
Eurostar – train service via the Channel Tunnel (since 1994)
Golden Arrow and La Flèche d’Or – boat trains that, in combination with a ferry, linked London with Paris
Night Ferry – sleeper train between London and Paris/Brussels (1936–1980)

References

Notes

Bibliography

International named passenger trains
Named passenger trains of France
Named passenger trains of British Rail
1956 establishments in England
1956 establishments in France
Airline routes
Railway services introduced in 1956